The 2005–06 Detroit Red Wings season was the 80th National Hockey League season in Detroit, Michigan. The Wings once again found themselves having the best regular season record, scoring 124 points for the second-highest point total in franchise history.

The Red Wings began the season with a conflict in goal as recent pickup Chris Osgood was injured in preseason activities and unproven Manny Legace was to start in goal. Legace played great, winning 10 of his first 11 games, and quickly earned the starting goaltender job. The Red Wings decided to start Legace in the playoffs but his inexperience quickly showed and Detroit was knocked out in the first round by the Edmonton Oilers (who'd go on to win the conference) in six games.

Detroit defenseman, Jiri Fischer, suffered a cardiac arrest in the first period of a game against the Nashville Predators on November 21. The game was stopped and eventually called as many fans in Joe Louis Arena either could not see what was going on or looked on in horror. Fischer was given CPR on the Wings' bench and then carried out on a stretcher. Nashville had a 1–0 lead within the game and it was decided that the score would be added onto the rescheduled game later in the season.

The Red Wings sold out all 41 home games in 2005–06, as 20,066 fans packed Joe Louis Arena for every regular season and playoff game played in Detroit.

There was no All-Star Game this year as the Winter Olympics in Turin took place in February 2006, where nine Red Wings players represented their countries. Kris Draper represented Canada, Chris Chelios represented the United States, Robert Lang represented the Czech Republic, Pavel Datsyuk represented Russia, and Nicklas Lidstrom, Mikael Samuelsson, Henrik Zetterberg, Niklas Kronwall and Tomas Holmstrom represented Sweden. Team Canada Head Coach Wayne Gretzky told Steve Yzerman it was his decision as to whether he wanted to play in the 2006 Olympics. Citing his age and playing ability, Yzerman bowed out to give up his roster spot to a "more deserving player."

Sweden won the gold medal in ice hockey, as all three goals scored in the gold medal game were by Red Wing players. Red Wings' Head Coach Mike Babcock decided to give the five gold medal winners from Detroit time to return to Sweden to celebrate. They only missed one game, February 28 against the San Jose Sharks. In that game, Detroit suffered their worst loss of the season, losing by four goals.

For the first time in 10 years, Detroit was not shut out in any of their 82 regular season games. Offensively, Detroit trailed only the Ottawa Senators in scoring and shots on goal, with 301 goals (305 including the four shootout-winning goals) and 2,796 shots, respectively. Furthermore, for the first time since the 1992–93 season, the Red Wings scored more than 100 power play goals during the regular season, this time with 102. Detroit had eight players on its roster that scored at least twenty goals each during the regular season.

Defensively, the Red Wings finished second in most shutouts for, with nine and allowed only 206 goals (209 including three shootout-winning goals), good enough for third overall.

Regular season
The Red Wings finished the regular season with the League's best power-play percentage, at 22.13% (102 for 461).

Season standings

For complete final standings, see 2005–06 NHL season

Playoffs
The Detroit Red Wings ended the 2005–06 regular season as the Western Conference's first seed and played Edmonton in the first round. Edmonton would go on to defeat Detroit and reach the Stanley Cup Finals, losing in Game 7 to the Carolina Hurricanes.

Schedule and results

Regular season

|- align="center" bgcolor="#bbffbb" 
| 1 || October 5 || St. Louis || 1 – 5 || Detroit || || Legace || 20,066 || 1–0–0 || 2 || 
|- align="center" bgcolor="#bbffbb" 
| 2 || October 6 || Detroit || 4 – 3 || St. Louis || || Legace || 15,318 || 2–0–0 || 4 || 
|- align="center" bgcolor="#bbffbb" 
| 3 || October 9 || Calgary || 3 – 6 || Detroit || || Legace || 20,066 || 3–0–0 || 6 || 
|- align="center" bgcolor="#ffbbbb" 
| 4 || October 10 || Vancouver || 4 – 2 || Detroit || || Legace || 20,066 || 3–1–0 || 6 || 
|- align="center" bgcolor="#bbffbb" 
| 5 || October 13 || Detroit || 5 – 2 || Los Angeles || || Legace || 18,118 || 4–1–0 || 8 || 
|- align="center" bgcolor="#bbffbb" 
| 6 || October 15 || Detroit || 2 – 0 || Phoenix || || Legace || 17,799 || 5–1–0 || 10 || 
|- align="center" bgcolor="#bbffbb" 
| 7 || October 17 || San Jose || 2 – 3 || Detroit || OT || Legace || 20,066 || 6–1–0 || 12 || 
|- align="center" bgcolor="#bbffbb" 
| 8 || October 21 || Anaheim || 2 – 3 || Detroit || || Legace || 20,066 || 7–1–0 || 14 || 
|- align="center" bgcolor="#bbffbb" 
| 9 || October 22 || Detroit || 6 – 0 || Columbus || || Legace || 18,136 || 8–1–0 || 16 || 
|- align="center" bgcolor="#bbffbb" 
| 10 || October 24 || Detroit || 6 – 2 || Columbus || || Legace || 16,098 || 9–1–0 || 18 || 
|- align="center" bgcolor="#bbffbb"
| 11 || October 27 || Chicago || 2 – 5 || Detroit || || Legace || 20,066 || 10–1–0 || 20 || 
|- align="center" bgcolor="#bbffbb" 
| 12 || October 29 || Detroit || 4 – 2 || Chicago || || Osgood || 20,658 || 11–1–0 || 22 || 
|-

|- align="center" bgcolor="#bbffbb" 
| 13 || November 1 || Chicago || 1 – 4 || Detroit || || Osgood || 20,066 || 12–1–0 || 24 || 
|- align="center" 
| 14 || November 3 || Edmonton || 4 – 3 || Detroit || OT || Osgood || 20,066 || 12–1–1 || 25 || 
|- align="center" bgcolor="#ffbbbb" 
| 15 || November 5 || Phoenix || 4 – 1 || Detroit || || Osgood || 20,066 || 12–2–1 || 25 || 
|- align="center" bgcolor="#bbffbb" 
| 16 || November 6 || Detroit || 4 – 1 || St. Louis || || Osgood || 13,211 || 13–2–1 || 27 || 
|- align="center" bgcolor="#bbffbb" 
| 17 || November 9 || Los Angeles || 5 – 4 || Detroit || OT || Legace || 20,066 || 14–2–1 || 29 || 
|- align="center" bgcolor="#bbffbb" 
| 18 || November 11 || Minnesota || 1 – 3 || Detroit || || Legace || 20,066 || 15–2–1 || 31 || 
|- align="center" bgcolor="#ffbbbb" 
| 19 || November 13 || Detroit || 1 – 4 || Vancouver || || Legace || 18,630 || 15–3–1 || 31 || 
|- align="center" bgcolor="#ffbbbb"
| 20 || November 16 || Detroit || 1 – 3 || Calgary || || Legace || 19,289 || 15–4–1 || 31 || 
|- align="center"
| 21 || November 17 || Detroit || 5 – 6 || Edmonton || OT || Osgood || 20,066 || 15–4–2 || 32 || 
|- align="center" bgcolor="#ffbbbb"
| 22 || November 19 || St. Louis || 3 – 2 || Detroit || || Legace || 20,066 || 15–5–2 || 32 || 
|- align="center" 
|  || November 21 || Nashville || PPD || Detroit || || Legace || 20,066 || || || 
|- align="center" bgcolor="#bbffbb" 
| 23 || November 23 || Colorado || 3 – 7 || Detroit || || Legace || 20,066 || 16–5–2 || 34 || 
|- align="center" bgcolor="#ffbbbb" 
| 24 || November 25 || Detroit || 1 – 3 || Anaheim || || Osgood || 17,174 || 16–6–2 || 34 || 
|- align="center" bgcolor="#bbffbb" 
| 25 || November 26 || Detroit || 7 – 6 || San Jose || || Osgood || 17,496 || 17–6–2 || 36 || 
|- align="center" bgcolor="#bbffbb" 
| 26 || November 28 || Detroit || 5 – 2 || Los Angeles || || Howard || 18,118 || 18–6–2 || 38 || 
|-
| colspan="11" style="text-align:center;"|
Notes:
 Game was cancelled with 7:31 left in the first period after Jiri Fischer suffered heart failure on the bench. Nashville was ahead 1–0 and the score would be added to a January 23 rescheduled game. Fischer was tended to and would soon after retire due to an enlarged heart and complications resulting thereof.
|-

|- align="center" bgcolor="#ffbbbb" 
| 27 || December 1 || Calgary || 3 – 2  || Detroit || || Howard || 20,066 || 18–7–2 || 38 || 
|- align="center" bgcolor="#ffbbbb" 
| 28 || December 4 || NY Islanders || 2 – 1 || Detroit || || Howard || 20,066 || 18–8–2 || 38 || 
|- align="center" bgcolor="#bbffbb" 
| 29 || December 6 || New Jersey || 2 – 5 || Detroit || || Osgood || 20,066 || 19–8–2 || 40 || 
|- align="center" bgcolor="#bbffbb" 
| 30 || December 9 || Detroit || 4 – 3 || Washington || || Osgood || 18,277 || 20–8–2 || 42 || 
|- align="center" bgcolor="#bbffbb" 
| 31 || December 12 || Pittsburgh || 1 – 3 || Detroit || || Osgood || 20,066 || 21–8–2 || 44 || 
|- align="center" bgcolor="#ffbbbb" 
| 32 || December 13 || Detroit || 6 – 7 || Atlanta || || Osgood || 17,559 || 21–9–2 || 44 || 
|- align="center"
| 33 || December 15 || Detroit || 2 – 3 || Florida || OT || Osgood || 17,716 || 21–9–3 || 45 || 
|- align="center" bgcolor="#bbffbb" 
| 34 || December 17 || Detroit || 6 – 3 || Tampa Bay || || Osgood || 21,204 || 22–9–3 || 47 || 
|- align="center" bgcolor="#bbffbb" 
| 35 || December 20 || Columbus || 3 – 4 || Detroit || SO || Osgood || 20,066 || 23–9–3 || 49 || 
|- align="center" bgcolor="#bbffbb" 
| 36 || December 23 || Detroit || 3 – 2 || Chicago || OT || Osgood || 20,543 || 24–9–3 || 51 || 
|- align="center" bgcolor="#bbffbb" 
| 37 || December 27 || Detroit || 4 – 1 || Dallas || || Osgood || 18,584 || 25–9–3 || 53 || 
|- align="center" bgcolor="#bbffbb"
| 38 || December 31 || Columbus || 2 – 3 || Detroit || OT || Osgood || 20,066 || 26–9–3 || 55 || 
|-

|- align="center" bgcolor="#ffbbbb" 
| 39 || January 3 || Minnesota || 4 – 2 || Detroit || || Osgood || 20,066 || 26–10–3 || 55 || 
|- align="center" bgcolor="#bbffbb" 
| 40 || January 5 || St. Louis || 0 – 3 || Detroit || || Legace || 20,066 || 27–10–3 || 57 || 
|- align="center" bgcolor="#bbffbb"  
| 41 || January 6 || Detroit || 3 – 1 || Nashville || || Legace || 17,113 || 28–10–3 || 59 || 
|- align="center" bgcolor="#ffbbbb" 
| 42 || January 8 || Dallas || 6 – 3 || Detroit || || Osgood || 20,066 || 28–11–3 || 59 || 
|- align="center" bgcolor="#ffbbbb" 
| 43 || January 10 || Detroit || 2 – 3 || Carolina || || Legace || 18,730 || 28–12–3 || 59 || 
|- align="center" bgcolor="#bbffbb" 
| 44 || January 12 || Philadelphia || 3 – 6 || Detroit || || Legace || 20,066 || 29–12–3 || 61 || 
|- align="center" bgcolor="#bbffbb"
| 45 || January 14 || NY Rangers || 3 – 4 || Detroit || || Legace || 20,066 || 30–12–3 || 63 || 
|- align="center" bgcolor="#bbffbb" 
| 46 || January 18 || Detroit || 4 – 0 || Columbus || || Osgood || 17,089 || 31–12–3 || 65 || 
|- align="center" bgcolor="#bbffbb" 
| 47 || January 21 || Detroit || 4 – 3 || Colorado || || Legace || 18,007 || 32–12–3 || 67 || 
|- align="center" bgcolor="#ffbbbb" 
| 48 || January 23 || Nashville || 3 – 2 || Detroit || || Legace || 20,066 || 32–13–3 || 67 || 
|- align="center"
| 49 || January 24 || Nashville || 2 – 1 || Detroit || OT || Legace || 20,066 || 32–13–4 || 67 || 
|- align="center" bgcolor="#bbffbb"
| 50 || January 26 || Vancouver || 1 – 2 || Detroit || || Legace || 20,066 || 33–13–4 || 69 || 
|- align="center"
| 51 || January 28 || Detroit || 1 – 2 || Dallas || SO || Legace || 18,584 || 33–13–5 || 71 || 
|- align="center" bgcolor="#bbffbb" 
| 52 || January 30 || Detroit || 5 – 4 || Minnesota || || Legace || 18,568 || 34–13–5 || 73 || 
|-
| colspan="11" style="text-align:center;"|
Notes:
 Makeup date for the November 21st game that was postponed. Nashville started the game with a 1–0 lead.
|-

|- align="center" bgcolor="#bbffbb" 
| 53 || February 1 || St. Louis || 2 – 3 || Detroit || || Legace || 20,066 || 35–13–5 || 75 || 
|- align="center" bgcolor="#bbffbb" 
| 54 || February 4 || Detroit || 3 – 0 || Colorado || || Legace || 18,007 || 36–13–5 || 77 || 
|- align="center" bgcolor="#bbffbb" 
| 55 || February 8 || Nashville || 0 – 6 || Detroit || || Legace || 20,066 || 37–13–5 || 79 || 
|- align="center" bgcolor="#bbffbb"  
| 56 || February 9 || Detroit || 3 – 2 || Nashville || || Legace || 17,113 || 38–13–5 || 81 || 
|- align="center" bgcolor="#bbffbb" 
| 57 || February 12 || Colorado || 3 – 6 || Detroit || || Legace || 20,066 || 39–13–5 || 83 || 
|- align="center" bgcolor="#ffbbbb" 
| 58 || February 28 || Detroit || 1 – 5 || San Jose || || Legace || 17,496 || 39–14–5 || 83 || 
|-

|- align="center" bgcolor="#bbffbb"
| 59 || March 1 || Detroit || 2 – 0 || Anaheim || || Osgood || 16,606 || 40–14–5 || 85 || 
|- align="center" bgcolor="#bbffbb" 
| 60 || March 4 || Detroit || 7 – 3 || Phoenix || || Legace || 18,619 || 41–14–5 || 87 || 
|- align="center" bgcolor="#ffbbbb"
| 61 || March 7 || Phoenix || 5 – 2 || Detroit || || Legace || 20,066 || 41–15–5 || 89 || 
|- align="center" bgcolor="#bbffbb"
| 62 || March 9 || Los Angeles || 3 – 7 || Detroit || || Legace || 20,066 || 42–15–5 || 89 || 
|- align="center" bgcolor="#bbffbb"
| 63 || March 11 || Chicago || 4 – 6 || Detroit || || Legace || 20,066 || 43–15–5 || 91 || 
|- align="center" bgcolor="#bbffbb"
| 64 || March 12 || Detroit || 5 – 3 || Chicago || || Osgood || 19,136 || 44–15–5 || 93 || 
|- align="center" bgcolor="#bbffbb"
| 65 || March 15 || Anaheim || 1 – 3 || Detroit || || Osgood || 20,066 || 45–15–5 || 95 || 
|- align="center" bgcolor="#bbffbb"
| 66 || March 18 || Detroit || 4 – 3 || Edmonton || SO || Legace || 16,839 || 46–15–5 || 97 || 
|- align="center" bgcolor="#bbffbb"
| 67 || March 19 || Detroit || 7 – 3 || Vancouver || || Osgood || 18,630 || 47–15–5 || 99 || 
|- align="center"
| 68 || March 21 || Nashville || 3 – 2 || Detroit || SO || Legace || 20,066 || 47–15–6 || 100 || 
|- align="center" bgcolor="#bbffbb"
| 69 || March 23 || San Jose || 0 – 4 || Detroit || || Legace || 20,066 || 48–15–6 || 102 || 
|- align="center"
| 70 || March 25 || Columbus || 5 – 4 || Detroit || SO || Osgood || 20,066 || 48–15–7 || 103 || 
|- align="center" bgcolor="#bbffbb"
| 71 || March 27 || Detroit || 4 – 1 || St. Louis || || Legace || 12,834 || 49–15–7 || 105 || 
|- align="center" bgcolor="#bbffbb"
| 72 || March 30 || Detroit || 4 – 2 || Nashville || || Legace || 16,570 || 50–15–7 || 107 || 
|- align="center"
| 73 || March 31 || Chicago || 3 – 2 || Detroit || OT || Osgood || 20,066 || 50–15–8 || 108 || 
|-

|- align="center" bgcolor="#bbffbb"
| 74 || April 2 || Detroit || 3 – 2 || Minnesota || || Legace || 18,568 || 51–15–8 || 110 || 
|- align="center" bgcolor="#bbffbb"
| 75 || April 3 || Detroit || 2 – 1 || Calgary || SO || Osgood || 19,289 || 52–15–8 || 112 || 
|- align="center" bgcolor="#bbffbb"
| 76 || April 7 || Columbus || 6 – 5 || Detroit || SO || Legace || 20,066 || 53–15–8 || 114 || 
|- align="center" bgcolor="#bbffbb"
| 77 || April 8 || Detroit || 4 – 2 || Columbus || || Osgood || 18,136 || 54–15–8 || 116 || 
|- align="center" bgcolor="#bbffbb"
| 78 || April 11 || Edmonton || 0 – 2 || Detroit || || Legace || 20,066 || 55–15–8 || 118 || 
|- align="center" bgcolor="#bbffbb"
| 79 || April 13 || Detroit || 7 – 3 || Chicago || || Legace || 15,117 || 56–15–8 || 120 || 
|- align="center" bgcolor="#bbffbb"
| 80 || April 15 || Detroit || 3 – 2 || St. Louis || || Osgood || 16,094 || 57–15–8 || 122 || 
|- align="center" bgcolor="#bbffbb"
| 81 || April 17 || Dallas || 2 – 3 || Detroit || || Legace || 20,066 || 58–15–8 || 124 || 
|- align="center" bgcolor="#ffbbbb"
| 82 || April 18 || Detroit || 3 – 6 || Nashville || || Osgood || 17,113 || 58–16–8 || 124 || 
|-

|-
| Legend:

Playoffs

|- align="center"  bgcolor="#bbffbb"
| 1 || April 21 || Edmonton || 2 – 3 || Detroit || 2OT || Legace || 20,066 || Red Wings lead 1–0 || 
|- align="center"  bgcolor="#ffbbbb"
| 2 || April 23 || Edmonton || 4 – 2 || Detroit || || Legace || 20,066 || Series tied 1–1 || 
|- align="center"  bgcolor="#ffbbbb"
| 3 || April 25 || Detroit || 3 – 4 || Edmonton || 2OT || Legace || 16,839 || Oilers lead 2–1 || 
|- align="center"  bgcolor="#bbffbb"
| 4 || April 27 || Detroit || 4 – 2 || Edmonton || || Legace || 16,839 || Series tied 2–2 || 
|- align="center"  bgcolor="#ffbbbb"
| 5 || April 29 || Edmonton || 3 – 2 || Detroit || || Legace || 20,066 || Oilers lead 3–2 || 
|- align="center"  bgcolor="#ffbbbb"
| 6 || May 1 || Detroit || 3 – 4 || Edmonton|| || Legace || 16,839 || Oilers win 4–2|| 
|-

|-
| Legend:

Player statistics

Scoring
 Position abbreviations: C = Center; D = Defense; G = Goaltender; LW = Left Wing; RW = Right Wing
  = Joined team via a transaction (e.g., trade, waivers, signing) during the season. Stats reflect time with the Red Wings only.
  = Left team via a transaction (e.g., trade, waivers, release) during the season. Stats reflect time with the Red Wings only.

Goaltending

Awards and records

Awards

Milestones

Transactions
The Red Wings were involved in the following transactions from February 17, 2005, the day after the 2004–05 NHL season was officially cancelled, through June 19, 2006, the day of the deciding game of the 2006 Stanley Cup Finals.

Trades

Players acquired

Players lost

Signings

Draft picks
As there was no 2004–05 season to set the order for the draft, a lottery was held in which teams were assigned a number of balls, between one and three, based on the number of playoff appearances the team had had in the past three seasons.  As the Red Wings had made the playoffs three consecutive seasons, they were given only one ball in the lottery. The Red Wings ended up with the 19th overall pick.

Detroit's picks at the 2005 NHL Entry Draft in Ottawa, Ontario:

Farm teams

Grand Rapids Griffins
The Griffins were Detroit's top affiliate in the American Hockey League in 2005–06.

Toledo Storm
The Storm were the Red Wings' ECHL affiliate for the 2005–06 season.

See also
2005–06 NHL season

Notes

References

Detroit Red Wings seasons
Detroit
Detroit
Presidents' Trophy seasons
Detroit Red Wings
Detroit Red Wings